Ravelo is a surname and given name of Spanish origin, originating as a habitational surname. Notable people with the surname or given name include:

Surname
Ana Ravelo, American paleoceanographer
Antonio Ravelo (1940-2014), Venezuelan footballer
Blas García Ravelo, Spanish sculptor
Eduardo Ravelo (born 1968), Mexican-American gangster
Jerson Ravelo (born 1977), Dominican boxer
Mars Ravelo (1916-1988), Filipino comic book artist and graphic novelist
Rangel Ravelo (born 1992), Cuban professional baseball first baseman and outfielder
Yangel Herrera (born 1998), full name Yangel Clemente Herrera Ravelo, Venezuelan professional footballer

Given name
Ravelo Manzanillo (born 1963), Dominican former pitcher

See also
Ravelo Municipality, a municipality in Potosí Department, Bolivia